The Spy Next Door is a 2010 American spy action comedy film directed by Brian Levant, written by Jonathan Bernstein, James Greer and Gregory Poirier, produced by Robert Simonds with music by David Newman. The film stars Jackie Chan, with a supporting cast of Amber Valletta, Magnús Scheving, Madeline Carroll, Will Shadley, Alina Foley, Billy Ray Cyrus and George Lopez. Filming started in late October 2008 in Rio Rancho, New Mexico and was finished in late December 2008. The film was released on January 15, 2010 in the United States by Lionsgate. The film was released on DVD, and Blu-ray on May 18, 2010. The film tributes Chan's films by showing clips, references and even referencing Chan's real life childhood. The film received negative reviews from critics and it earned $45.2 million on a $28 million budget.

Plot
Bob Ho is an operative of the CIA as an undercover agent on loan from the Chinese Intelligence, who decides to retire after putting Russian terrorist Anton Poldark behind bars and marry his longtime girlfriend Gillian, who lives next door and has three children from previous relationships, Farren (a step-daughter), Ian and Nora. None of them know about his real job and think he works at a pen-importing company.

One day, Gillian leaves to visit her father in a hospital in Denver, Colorado and leaves Bob to take care of her children, but Farren and Ian despise him and plot to get rid of him. Using technology from the CIA, Bob is able to take control and gradually bond with the children. His partner, Colton James, informs him that Poldark has escaped from jail and they suspect there is a mole in the CIA. Colton sends a file to Bob's computer for a top-secret formula for an oil-eating bacteria Poldark is working on. While snooping around Bob's house, Ian downloads the file, which he mistakes for music, onto his iPod. Poldark discovers the download and sends some of his henchmen to Bob's house, but Bob overpowers them.

After the attack, Bob and the children hide at a Chinese restaurant, where Poldark's teenage henchman, Larry, tries to kill Bob. Bob defeats him and is forced to tell the children about his job. His boss Glaze then arrives, points a gun at him, and demands the downloaded file, revealing himself to be working for Poldark. Bob knocks out Glaze with Nora's turtle, then hides in a hotel with the children. Farren tells Gillian over the phone about Bob's secret. As they wait, Farren stubbornly holds out hope that her biological father will come back to get her so she can have a "real family". Bob tells her that family is more than just sharing blood ties with someone, revealing that he never knew his birth parents and was raised in a Chinese orphanage. As a result, Bob chose to think of everyone else at the orphanage as his family despite not being related to anyone there. Farren realizes that her father is not coming back for her and accepts Ian and Nora as her siblings. Fearing for her children's safety, Gillian flies home to take them back and angrily breaks up with Bob for lying to her.

Bob heads to an abandoned factory to confront the Russian terrorists but finds that Ian, wanting to become a spy, followed him and Farren has run away from home to try and help as well. The three are captured by the Russians, who trick Ian into revealing that the file is on his iPod quite easily since Ian does not know how to handle an interrogation. As Poldark, his partner Tatiana, and Glaze go to Gillian's house, Bob and the children escape and return home, where Poldark and his crew arrive soon after. Bob, Gillian's family, and the terrorists fight, with the children using Bob's secret weapons to defeat some of them, and soon after Colton and his crew arrive to arrest the Russians and Glaze. Gillian initially rejects Bob but changes her mind when the kids express their heartfelt approval of him with Farren even calling Gillian "Mom" for the first time. In the end, Bob and Gillian get married. At the altar, Bob confesses to Gillian that Bob is not his real name, which Gillian and her children accept with a laugh.

Cast

 Jackie Chan as Bob Ho, a spy for the CIA and Gillian's neighbor, boyfriend, and eventual husband
 Amber Valletta as Gillian, Bob's neighbor, girlfriend, and eventual wife 
 Magnús Scheving as Anton Poldark, a Russian terrorist
 Madeline Carroll as Farren, Gillian's step-daughter 
 Will Shadley as Ian, Gillian's son 
 Alina Foley as Nora, Gillian's daughter
 Billy Ray Cyrus as Colton James, Bob's partner 
 George Lopez as Glaze, Bob's corrupt boss
 Lucas Till as Larry, a teenager working with Poldark
Katherine Boecher as Tatiana Creel, Poldark's girlfriend and henchman
 Tim Connolly as Russian thug 
 Troy Brenna as Russian thug
 Jeff Chase as Russian thug
 Mark Kubr as Russian thug 
 David Mattey as Russian thug 
 Scott Workman as Russian thug
 Esodie Geiger as Principal 
 Arron Shiver as Scientist 
 Richard Christie as Judge

Soundtrack
 "Secret Agent Man" – Performed by Johnny Rivers
 "The Way It Was" – Written and Performed by Daniel May
 "Ba Ma De Hua" – Performed by Jackie Chan (theme song of Rob-B-Hood, a film also made by Chan)
 "One Way or Another" – Performed by Blondie

Release

Box office
In its first weekend, in the US, The Spy Next Door made $9.7 million in 2,924 theaters, opening at #6. It grossed $12.9 million over the four-day period, ranking #5 on that term. The film grossed $45.1 million on a $28 million budget.

Critical reception

On Rotten Tomatoes the film has an approval rating of 12% based on 89 reviews, with an average rating of 3.5/10. The site's critical consensus reads, "Lacking a script funny enough to cover up for Jackie Chan's fading physical gifts, The Spy Next Door fails on every conceivable level." On Metacritic, which assigns a normalized rating to reviews, it holds an average score of 27 out of 100 based on 21 critics, indicating "generally unfavorable reviews". Audiences polled by CinemaScore gave the film an average grade of "A−" on an A+ to F scale.
 
Most film critics targeted the film for "lacking a script," and "looking old" such as Michael Phillips of The Chicago Tribune for being "True Lies without the striptease or the Arab-maiming" and Kyle Smith of The New York Post who also claimed the film is "ripping off True Lies." Lael Loewenstein of Variety gave the film a negative review saying the film's "cartoonish jokes and misfired gags are likely to elicit more eye rolls than laughs." Daniel Eagan of The Hollywood Reporter also disliked the film saying most of the film is "pretty tired stuff from Pacifier-style slapstick to comic relief delivered by, of all people, erstwhile country star Billy Ray Cyrus" and that Chan "seems stiff" and "clad in unattractive clothes and forced into dumbed-down situations."
David Stratton of At the Movies dismissed the film calling it "a sad viewing experience". He added "The woeful screenplay, the mundane direction, by Brian Levant, and the indifferent acting all combine to sink a stupid plot which should never have got off the ground." Carrie Rickey of The Philadelphia Inquirer gave the film 2½ stars. Rickey, giving the film the benefit of the doubt, wrote "The plot may be forgettable, but the execution is frantic and funny. The Spy Next Door is a movie that will bring smiles to kids – and their grandparents."

Home media

The Spy Next Door was released on DVD and Blu-ray on May 18, 2010.

Awards and nominations

See also

The Pacifier
True Lies
Man of the House
Kindergarten Cop
Big Momma's House

References

External links
 
 
 
 
 

2009 films
2009 action comedy films
2000s spy comedy films
American films about Halloween
American action comedy films
American spy comedy films
Films about dysfunctional families
Films about the Central Intelligence Agency
Films about the Russian Mafia
Films directed by Brian Levant
Films scored by David Newman
Films shot in New Mexico
Lionsgate films
Relativity Media films
2000s English-language films
2000s American films